WPFD (850 AM, "La Mejor") was a daytime-only radio station broadcasting a Regional Mexican music format. Licensed to Fairview, Tennessee, the station was owned by S V Communications Inc.

WPFD's facility record has been deleted from the U.S. Federal Communications Commission website. The license has been cancelled. A new construction permit would have to be granted for the station to return to the air.

References

External links

PFD
PFD
Regional Mexican radio stations in the United States
Mass media in Williamson County, Tennessee
Radio stations established in 1982
1982 establishments in Tennessee
Defunct radio stations in the United States
Radio stations disestablished in 2012
2012 disestablishments in Tennessee
PFD
PFD